Juan Carlos Robinson Agramonte (born July 16, 1956), was a member of the Cuban politburo and First Secretary of the Provincial Committee of the Cuban Communist Party in Santiago de Cuba. In April 2006 he was dismissed from the Politburo, and in June he was sentenced to 12 years in prison for corruption. .
He was released from prison in 2010.

External links

 Cuba sacks top government member - from the BBC news website.

1956 births
Living people
Communist Party of Cuba politicians
Cuban prisoners and detainees
Prisoners and detainees of Cuba